MacGyver is an American television series that ran from the late 1980s to the early 1990s.

MacGyverisms and "to MacGyver" 
MacGyver employs his resourcefulness and his knowledge of chemistry, physics, technology, and outdoorsmanship to resolve what are often life-or-death crises. He creates inventions from simple items to solve these problems. These inventions became synonymous with the character and were called MacGyverisms by fans. MacGyver was unlike secret agents in other television series and films because, instead of relying on high-tech weapons and tools, he carried only a Swiss Army knife and duct tape. This also led to the verb 'to MacGyver' or 'to MacGyver-ize' (the latter being introduced by Gregory Shockley in his training manuscripts published for the Boy Scouts of America). 'MacGyverism' was first used by Joanne Remmings (played by Pamela Bowen) in the third episode of Season 2. When MacGyver introduces himself to her, she uses the term in a manner that suggests other people had used it before:
"Oh I've heard about you! You're the guy who does the whatchamacallits, you know, MacGyverisms; turns one thing into another?"
On Stargate SG-1, in the pilot episode "Children of the Gods", Samantha Carter says, "it took us fifteen years and three supercomputers to MacGyver a system for the gate on Earth". One of the people she says it to is Colonel Jack O'Neill who is played by Richard Dean Anderson, the actor who portrayed MacGyver.
In the 1998 movie Half Baked, they describe a type of pothead called a "MacGyver smoker", who can make a bong out of an avocado, ice-pick, and a snorkel.
In the episode of A Gifted Man (2012) entitled "In Case Of Letting Go", Dr. Zeke Barnes explains that he can "MacGyver" a splint for a friend's broken hand using duct tape and a plastic knife.
In the role-playing game Mage: The Ascension, techno-mages use the term "to MacGyver", when performing obviously magical feats with technological gadgets, or reinforce their doings with pseudo-scientific explanation.

Uses of the theme song 
The Ja Rule song "How Many Wanna" from the soundtrack of the 1999 film Light It Up samples the MacGyver theme song.
Japanese pro wrestler Yuji Yasuraoka used the MacGyver theme song as his entrance theme.

Other cultural references 
The series is referenced in many episodes of The Simpsons, primarily detailing Marge Simpson's sisters Patty and Selma's obsession with the show and their crush on the titular character. The sisters' regular viewing of the show is an unalterable element of their daily schedule to the point of death as demonstrated in the episode "Black Widower". The episode featured a fictional scene of MacGyver where he downplays his role in saving a village ("Don't thank me. Thank the moon's gravitational pull"). In "A Star is Burns", Homer tricks Jay Sherman into insulting MacGyver in front of Patty and Selma; Sherman ends up being hung from the rain gutter by his underpants, and Bart asks "You badmouthed MacGyver, didn't you?" In "Kiss Kiss, Bang Bangalore", Patty and Selma kidnap Richard Dean Anderson after he admits he thought MacGyver was stupid. Anderson gains an appreciation of the series after using a MacGyver-style technique to escape, before returning to let the sisters know how he did it and then demanding they tie him up so he can try to escape again. The sisters eventually grow tired of his increasingly demanding escape requests, and end up forcing Anderson to run after submitting him to one of their boring holiday slideshows.
In the season one episode "Brian: Portrait of a Dog" of Family Guy, Peter writes a letter to Richard Dean Anderson asking him to save his dog using the enclosed items from the envelope: a rubber band, a paper clip and a straw. Anderson puts these together and hits himself in the eye with the rubber band.
The New Zealand sporting skit show Pulp Sport had a running gag called "McIvor" in which the MacGyver theme is played, and a prank involving Sky TV sports presenter Steven McIvor is played out. This gag, instead, now targets TV3 sports news presenter Hamish McKay (dubbed "McKay-ver").
G4 aired a small series of MacGyver parodies about a young corporate cubicle worker known as MacGunner. He would construct ridiculous items out of cubicle materials, such as several dozen markers hooked end to end in order to reach over to his arch-enemy's cubicle and type a scathing email to the boss.
In the bonus footage to Stargate SG-1, "Inside SG-1," a prank is played on Richard Dean Anderson where he is berated for not being able to figure out how to use "belt buckles, shoelaces, and a piece of gum"  get them out of a situation despite having played MacGyver for 7 years.
In the 2003 song "MacGyver" by the British band Million Dead, MacGyver is described as a symbol of the "Scottish Enlightenment" whose rationality is unable to save him after he is severely beaten by a youth gang.
Lawrence Leung's Choose Your Own Adventure features an episode where Lawrence tries to track down his childhood hero, MacGyver, in various locations that were used in the show.
The XKCD webcomic #444 from August 2, 2008, "Macgyver Gets Lazy", portrays MacGyver providing an elaborate, MacGyver-like explanation for the act of simply shooting a guard with a handgun.
The Lego character of Jack Stone has similarities to MacGyver, as he uses inspiration to turn ordinary vehicles and objects into new things in order to solve solutions. Also, he has a similar appearance.

MacGruber 

In 2007, the NBC sketch show Saturday Night Live featured a parody of MacGyver called "MacGruber" with Will Forte as the title character. The intros for these skits featured scenes from the MacGyver series. MacGruber and cohorts are always locked in a control room of some type with a bomb set to go off in about 15–20 seconds. MacGruber has his costars hand him components to defuse the device, but MacGruber's personal issues inevitably get in the way of the operation, and the bomb detonates.

In a 2009 episode where Richard Dean Anderson guest stars as the original Angus MacGyver, MacGruber learns he is actually MacGyver's son and that "MacGruber" is in fact his first name.

The sketch was adapted as the 2010 film MacGruber.

MythBusters 
In February 2008, the popular science show MythBusters featured a MacGyver special which tested several of MacGyver's tactics. The first test examined MacGyver's famous cold capsule bomb, which utilized the explosive reaction of alkali metals with water. Supposedly, dropping 1 gram of sodium metal into water will cause an explosive reaction powerful enough to blow a hole through a cinderblock wall. However, despite using 100 grams of sodium metal, the wall remained completely intact.

In the 2009 season, the MythBusters tested a scene from MacGyver's season 2 episode "The Wish Child," where MacGyver blew open a door lock by taking the gunpowder from a revolver's six cartridges and packing them together with a leftover primer that he detonated by striking it with the gun's butt. Not only did the MythBusters fail in setting off the primer, it also proved to be impossible to disassemble the cartridges by hand. Even after switching smokeless powder for black powder and fitting the revolver's butt with a firing pin for a successful detonation, the lock remained intact. A charge with 120 cartridges worth of black powder set off by electric igniter managed to destroy the lock, proving the concept, though due to the sheer amount of gunpowder needed and vastly surpassing MacGyver's methods and resources, the myth was declared busted.

However, some of MacGyver's tactics were confirmed. The MythBusters were able to pick a lock using the filament of an incandescent lightbulb, although it took the MythBusters considerably longer to do than it took MacGyver (50 minutes as opposed to 56 seconds). Another "confirmed" MacGyver tactic was building an electromagnet using ordinary household batteries, tape and insulated wire (the insulated rubber surrounding the wire was removed with a cheese grater.)

It was also implied, although it was not successfully tested, that it is possible to develop a roll of film using orange juice as an acid and ammonia as an alkaline fixer while holding a garbage bag over the setup to create a darkroom. Another implied, but not tested, tactic was creating a potato cannon using hairspray as a fuel, a camp stove as the ignition, and PVC pipe as the mortar.

Also, in episode 15, in July 2004, a portion of the episode titled "Car Capers" featured the MythBusters testing of a tactic in which an egg placed into a car's radiator would subsequently cook and plug holes in said radiator. This had been featured in an episode of MacGyver titled "Bushmaster", and was originally an idea sent in by a fan. The myth was deemed plausible.

Grant Imahara humorously referred to MacGyver as "the second greatest TV series of all time" in the 2006 season MythBusters episode "Crimes and Myth-Demeanors 1".

References 

Popular culture
Television shows in popular culture